Edmund Alexander Spurr (died 1873) was a British architect who designed and was the superintendent of the Great Northern Cemetery (now known as the New Southgate Cemetery) in London, England. He was a fellow of the Royal Institute of British Architects. Spurr is buried at New Southgate Cemetery.

Spurr designed the Great Northern on a spoke and wheel plan with an episcopal chapel at the centre. The chapel was in the early English lancet style with a broach spire of 150 feet.

References 

1873 deaths
New Southgate Cemetery
Burials at New Southgate Cemetery
Year of birth missing
Fellows of the Royal Institute of British Architects
Architects from London